Pygmaeosomatidae is a family of millipedes belonging to the order Chordeumatida. Adult millipedes in this family have 30 or 32 segments (counting the collum as the first segment and the telson as the last).

Genera:
 Betscheuma Mauriès, 1994
 Hendersonula Pocock, 1903
 Pygmaeosoma Carl, 1941

References

Chordeumatida
Millipede families